Setthathirath II (died 1735), also called Ong Lo and Sai Ong Hue (also spelled Xai Ong Ve),  grandson of the great ruler Suliyavongsa, was the king of the Lao Kingdom of Lān Xāng. In Vietnamese records, he was called Triều Phúc (朝福).

He spent most of his early years as a prince of the royal house in exile at Huế (now in Vietnam). His father Prince Som Phou fled to Vietnam upon the placement by the nobles of his younger brother (Setthathirath II's uncle) Suliyavongsa was king of Lan Xang. Upon the 1694 death of King Suliyavongsa, a noble named Tian Thala ascended to the throne. Within six months, Tian Thala was deposed.

In 1698 Setthathirath II attacked Vientiane, the capital of Lan Xang. In 1699, Nan Tharat became ruler and with the aid of Vietnamese forces, Setthathirath II ousted King Nan Tharat and secured the city. In 1700 he declared himself king under the name Sethathirat II, and in 1705 he moved the Prabang Buddha, the sacred religious statue and symbol of royalty, from Luang Prabang to Vientiane.

Setthathirath II then sent his brother to take the northern city of Loung Prabang from his cousin Prince Kitsarat (or Kitsarath), a grandson of King Suliyavongsa, who refused to recognize his authority. Kitsarat asks for assistance from the Siamese King and was granted independence from Lan Xang, creating the Kingdom of Luang Phrabang and converting Lan Xang into the Kingdom of Vientiane.

In 1713, another grandson of Suliyavongsa, Prince Nokasat Song or Nokasad, saw the opportunity to break away from Lan Xang to the South, and was also granted independence from Siam to form the Kingdom of Champasak, which further divided the Lao Kingdom.

Issue 
King Sethathirat II had issue: three sons and one daughter.
 Prince (Sadet Chao Fa Anga) Lankaya [Ong-Long], who succeeded as H.M. Samdach Brhat Chao Dharma Adi Varman Maha Sri Ungalankaya Chandrapuri Sri Sadhana Kanayudha, King of Lang-Xang Vientiane. 
 Prince (Sadet Chao Fa Anga) Bunya [Ong-Bun], who succeeded as H.M. Samdach Brhat Chao Maha Sri Bunyasena Jaya Setha Adiraja Chandrapuri Sri Sadhana Kanayudha [Bunsan], King of Lang-Xang Vientiane. 
 Prince (Sadet Chao Fa Jaya) Guangnaya [Khuang-Na]. Appointed as Viceroy with the title of Samdach Brhat Chao Maha Uparaja 1730. 
 A daughter. m. 1699, Phra Chao Sarasak, Upayuvaraja of Ayudhya, son of Phra Phetraja, King of Ayudhya 1684–1698.

References
 http://www.britannica.com/eb/article-9064762/Sai-Ong-Hue

Further reading
 Peter Simms & Sanda Simms. The Kingdoms of Laos: Six Hundred Years of History. Routledge (1999), pp 107–16. .

Kings of Lan Xang
Kings of Vientiane
Year of birth unknown
17th-century births
1735 deaths
18th-century Laotian people
18th century in Vientiane
18th-century monarchs in Asia
Laotian Theravada Buddhists
1700s in Lan Xang
1700s in Asia
17th-century Laotian people
18th century in Lan Xang